İğde is a belde (large village with a municipality), also called İğde kasabası, in southern Turkey. Now its municipality is managed by Elbistan's municipality. The "belde" is located between Elbistan (16 km from it) and Ekinözü.

The dominant climate is the continental one. The climate is very dry, but irrigation is provided by the Ceyhan River (that takes birth in Elbistan), one of the biggest rivers in Turkey. There are one elementary and one high school.

Neighbourhoods
Merkez
Cami
Tekke

References

Populated places in Kahramanmaraş Province
Districts of Kahramanmaraş Province
Towns in Turkey
Elbistan